Prince Alexander, known in Russia as the tsarevich Alexander Bagratovich Gruzinsky (1820–1865) was a Georgian prince (batonishvili), a descendant of the Kartli-Kakhetian branch of Bagrationi dynasty, the former royal house of Georgia. Alexander was a son of Prince Bagrat of Georgia, the 4th son of king George XII of Georgia.

Family
Prince Aleksandre (1820–1865) married firstly, in 1851, Princess Elene Tarkhan-Mouravi (7 July 1831 – 1903) and later divorced; and secondly married Princess Ekaterina (Ketevan) Andronikashvili.

He had 9 children from the first marriage:

Princess Ekaterine Gruzinskaya (born 1852).
Prince Bagrat Gruzinsky (born 1853).
Prince Ilia Gruzinsky (13 September 1854 – 4 August 1885).
Prince Pyotr Gruzinsky (26 April 1857 – 3 February 1922).  
Prince Giorgi Gruzinsky (25 April 1858 – 1922).
Prince Mikheil Gruzinsky (10 February 1860 – 1935).
Princess Sopio Gruzinskaya (1861–1863).
Prince Ivane Gruzinsky (born 1863).
Prince Levan Gruzinsky (1863–1864).

Ancestry

References

1820 births
Bagrationi dynasty of the Kingdom of Kartli-Kakheti
Pretenders to the Georgian throne
1865 deaths